The Alrov Group is a real estate development company headquartered in Tel Aviv, Israel. It is listed on the Tel Aviv Stock Exchange.

History
The company was founded in 1978 by Alfred Akirov, who holds the title of chairman. Its co-Chief Executive Officers are Shmuel Ben Moshe and Meir Alhacham.

Mamilla Project 
In 1995 Alrov purchased the Mamilla Project in the center of Jerusalem and finished the building of the David Village project and the hotel Hilton Jerusalem, that later changed its name to David Citadel Hotel.

The construction and development stopped a few times due to archeological research and legal affairs but resumed in 2006.

In 2007, a part of the Alrov Boulevard (the historic Mamilla street) and the Alrov mall opened. In 2009 Mamilla Hotel was opened and in 2010 the project was completed.

Hotels 
The group owns the David Citadel Hotel and the Mamilla Hotel (near the Mamilla Mall), both of which are in Jerusalem, Israel. It acquired the Conservatorium Hotel in Amsterdam and the Café Royal in London in 2008. In 2010, it acquired the Hôtel Lutetia in Paris.

References

External links

Companies based in Tel Aviv
Companies listed on the Tel Aviv Stock Exchange
Real estate companies established in 1978
1978 establishments in Israel